Chen Jing (born 20 September 1968 in Wuhan, Hubei) is a retired table tennis player and Olympic champion for China, and later Olympic medalist for Chinese Taipei.

Early life 
Chen Jing was born on September 20, 1968 in Wuhan, Hubei Province. At the age of 11, she was the champion of the youth bracket in a table tennis tournament hosted by the Children's Palace in Wuhan, and was selected for the Hubei Province team. At the age of 18, she was selected for the Chinese national team.

Professional career 
She received a golden medal in singles and a silver medal in doubles at the 1988 Summer Olympics in Seoul.

In 1991, she defected to Taiwan after failing to make the national team in 1990, where she won the Taiwanese national table tennis competition and joined the Taiwanese national team. Competing for Chinese Taipei (Taiwan), she received a silver medal at the 1996 Summer Olympics in Atlanta, the first medal for Taiwan in the table tennis category. She received a bronze medal at the 2000 Summer Olympics in Sydney.

Personal life 
In 1992, she started studying at Princeton University, where she assumed a position as the coach of the Princeton table tennis team and studied English. After the 1996 Olympics, she returned to Taipei Physical Education College to obtain her Masters' Degree. In 2003, she started studying at South China Normal University to obtain her Doctorate in Sports Psychology.

See also
 List of table tennis players
 List of World Table Tennis Championships medalists
 Chire Koyama

References

External links

1968 births
Living people
Chinese female table tennis players
Olympic gold medalists for China
Olympic silver medalists for Taiwan
Olympic table tennis players of China
Table tennis players at the 1988 Summer Olympics
Table tennis players at the 1996 Summer Olympics
Table tennis players at the 2000 Summer Olympics
Olympic table tennis players of Taiwan
Olympic medalists in table tennis
Asian Games medalists in table tennis
Table tennis players at the 1994 Asian Games
Table tennis players at the 1998 Asian Games
Medalists at the 1994 Asian Games
Medalists at the 1998 Asian Games
Asian Games bronze medalists for Chinese Taipei
Taiwanese people from Hubei
Table tennis players from Wuhan
Naturalised table tennis players
Taiwanese female table tennis players
Olympic silver medalists for China
Olympic bronze medalists for Taiwan
Medalists at the 1996 Summer Olympics
Medalists at the 2000 Summer Olympics
Medalists at the 1988 Summer Olympics